Football at the 2014 Asian Games was held in Incheon, South Korea from 14 September to 3 October 2014. The opening match was played 5 days prior to the opening ceremony. In this tournament, 29 teams are playing in the men's competition, and 11 teams are participating in the women's competition.

The age limit for the men teams is under-23; the same as the age limit in football competitions in the Olympic Games, while three overage players are allowed among each squad.

Schedule

Medalists

Medal table

Draw
A draw ceremony was held on 21 August 2014 to determine the groups for the men's and women's competitions. The teams were seeded based on their final ranking at the 2010 Asian Games.

Men

Group A
 
 
 
 

Group B
 
 
 
 

Group C
 
 
 
 

Group D
 
 
 
 

Group E
 
 
 
 

Group F
 
 
 

Group G
 
 
 

Group H

Women

Group A
 
 
 
 

Group B
 
 
 
 

Group C

Squads

Final standing

Men

Women

References

External links
 Official website
  Schedule & Results (PDF)

 
Asian Games
2014
Asian Games 2014
2014 Asian Games events
2014 in South Korean football